= Ilandaikulam =

- town
- Interactive map of Ilandaikulam
- Coordinates: 9.9376°N 78.1905°E
- Country: India
- State: Tamil Nadu

Languages
  - Official: Tamil
- Time zone: UTC+5:30 (IST)

Ilandaikulam is a village in Madurai district, India. It is about 2 km (1.2 mi) from Maatuthavani bus stand. It is also very close to the ring road. The Tamil Nadu government has plans to open the IT park very soon here. Elcot has proposed that the IT park will be built in 50 acres (200,000 m^{2}).
